This is a list of the municipalities in the state of Goiás (GO), in the Central-West Region of Brazil. Goiás is divided into 246 municipalities, which are grouped into 18 microregions, which are grouped into 5 mesoregions.

Ordered by regions

Ordered by population
List of municipalities in Goiás by population, in descending order, based on estimates from IBGE for 1 July 2005.

More than 500,000 inhabitants

More than 100,000 inhabitants

More than 50,000 inhabitants

More than 25,000 inhabitants

More than 10,000 inhabitants

More than 5,000 inhabitants

Fewer than 5,000 inhabitants

Ordered by area and population
This is a list of municipalities in the state of Goiás, Brazil.  Population figures are estimates from 2005.  Area figures are from 2002.

See also
Geography of Brazil
List of cities in Brazil

Goias